The Plum Creek Library System is a network of libraries throughout southwestern Minnesota, United States. It serves 25 city and 8 school libraries in 9 counties. Each library is locally controlled, but they cooperate through interlibrary loans of materials.

References

External links
Plum Creek Library System web site

County library systems in Minnesota
Education in Lincoln County, Minnesota
Education in Lyon County, Minnesota
Education in Redwood County, Minnesota
Education in Pipestone County, Minnesota
Education in Murray County, Minnesota
Education in Cottonwood County, Minnesota
Education in Rock County, Minnesota
Education in Nobles County, Minnesota
Education in Jackson County, Minnesota